James Stephen Ringo (November 21, 1931 – November 19, 2007) was an American professional football player and coach in the National Football League (NFL). He played 15 years as a center, earning 10 Pro Bowl sections. He was inducted into the Pro Football Hall of Fame in 1981.

Early years
Born in Orange, New Jersey, Ringo grew up in Phillipsburg and played high school football at Phillipsburg High School and college football at Syracuse University in Syracuse, New York.

Professional career

Green Bay Packers
The Packers selected him in the seventh round of the 1953 NFL draft.

He was not, however, unfit for the role; he used his outstanding quickness and excellent technique to build a 15-year NFL career, the first 11 with the Packers, as one of the game's best centers.

Ringo played for four different head coaches in Green Bay. In his first six seasons under Gene Ronzani (1953), Lisle Blackbourn (1954–57), and Ray "Scooter" McLean (1958), the Packers went 

But Vince Lombardi's arrival in January 1959 changed everything, and for Ringo's next five seasons, the Packers went  and 2–1 in championship games. Ringo certainly knew individual success before the Lombardi era—attending his first of seven straight Pro Bowls in 1957—but he flourished under the coaching legend, earning consensus All-Pro honors from 1959 to 1963.

Ringo's speed and mobility made him an ideal blocker for Lombardi's famous Packers sweep, and all but one of running back Jim Taylor's five 1,000-yard seasons—including his then-record 1,474-yard effort in 1962—came with Ringo at center.

Philadelphia Eagles
Ringo was a member of the Packers' NFL Championship teams of 1961 and 1962 but was traded to the Philadelphia Eagles 
The details of Ringo's trade have been the subject of speculation. In his memoir, Jerry Kramer, who played guard next to Ringo from 1958 to 1963, recounted the story that following the 1963 season, Ringo showed up in Lombardi's office with an agent in tow and looking to negotiate a raise. Lombardi, according to this account, was so angered that he excused himself for five minutes only to return and announce that he had traded Ringo to the Eagles. Over the years, it has been suggested that that story is more fiction than fact. In reality, Lombardi had probably been negotiating a trade for some time. The Packers also traded fullback Earl Gros and received in return linebacker Lee Roy Caffey and a first-round draft pick, which was used to select halfback-punter Donny Anderson as a "future pick" in 1965. Still, the legend persists. Ringo, who played 126 consecutive games for the Packers from 1954–63, finished out his career with the Eagles, attending three more Pro Bowls and retiring after the 1967 season.

Coaching
He went on to work on the coaching staffs of the Los Angeles Rams, Buffalo Bills (two separate engagements), Chicago Bears, New England Patriots, and New York Jets, and he served as Bills head coach after the resignation of Lou Saban in 1976, posting a 3–20 record. He is best known as a coach for creating the dominant Bills offensive line of the early- to mid-1970s called the Electric Company, which supported running back O. J. Simpson. He returned to Buffalo as the Bills offensive coordinator and offensive line coach in 1985. He held the positions until his retirement after the 1988 season.

Ringo was inducted into the Pro Football Hall of Fame in 1981.

Death
Ringo died November 19, 2007, in Chesapeake, Virginia, after a short illness. He is buried at Fairmount Cemetery in his hometown of Phillipsburg, New Jersey.

Head coaching record

References

External links
 
 
 

1931 births
2007 deaths
People from Orange, New Jersey
People from Phillipsburg, New Jersey
Sportspeople from Essex County, New Jersey
Sportspeople from Warren County, New Jersey
Players of American football from New Jersey
American football centers
Phillipsburg High School (New Jersey) alumni
Syracuse Orange football players
Green Bay Packers players
Philadelphia Eagles players
Western Conference Pro Bowl players
Eastern Conference Pro Bowl players
Pro Football Hall of Fame inductees
Coaches of American football from New Jersey
Chicago Bears coaches
Buffalo Bills coaches
Buffalo Bills head coaches
New England Patriots coaches
Los Angeles Rams coaches
New York Jets coaches